Michael Oliver (born 20 February 1985) is an English professional football referee from Ashington, Northumberland. His county FA is the Northumberland Football Association. He belongs to the Select Group of Referees in England and officiates primarily in the Premier League. He received his FIFA badge in 2012, allowing him to officiate in major international matches. Oliver was appointed to take charge of the final of the 2015 FIFA U-17 World Cup. Oliver was promoted to the UEFA Elite Group of Referees in 2018.

Refereeing career
Born in Ashington, Northumberland, Oliver was introduced to refereeing by his father, Clive, at the age of 14. He quickly progressed through the ranks and was promoted to the National List of Referees in 2007; he refereed the 2007 Conference National play-off final, becoming the youngest football referee to officiate at Wembley Stadium. In addition he had already become the youngest Football League assistant referee, youngest Football League referee, and would also become the youngest fourth official in the Premier League.

The Oliver family enjoyed a unique refereeing double when father Clive took charge of the 2009 League Two play-off final and Michael officiated the next day at the 2009 League One play-off final.
Oliver was set to become the youngest referee in the Premier League when he was appointed to a match between Fulham and Portsmouth in January 2010. However, adverse weather resulted in him having to postpone the match, and an ankle operation later sidelined him until April. He was promoted to the Select Group in August 2010, his first appointment being Birmingham City versus Blackburn Rovers. Oliver was 25 years and 182 days old, breaking Stuart Attwell's record as the youngest-ever Premier League referee. 

Oliver was appointed fourth official for the 2013 League Cup final at Wembley Stadium. He refereed the FA Cup semi-final between Wigan Athletic and Millwall in April 2013 and in doing so became the youngest referee to take charge of an FA Cup semi-final. Wigan went on to win the FA Cup and played Manchester United in the subsequent FA Community Shield match in which Oliver was assigned as fourth official.

He was the referee for the 2014 FA Community Shield between Arsenal and Manchester City. The FA Cup holders Arsenal won the match 3–0.

Oliver refereed three group stage matches in the 2016–17 UEFA Champions League, his first being Sporting CP against Legia Warsaw in September 2016.

On 11 April 2018, Oliver refereed the second leg of the 2017–18 UEFA Champions League quarter-final between Real Madrid and Juventus. Real Madrid won the first leg 3–0 in Turin, which meant Juventus would have to win 3–0 in Madrid to take the match to extra time. Juventus led 3–0 until the 93rd minute, when Oliver awarded an injury time penalty to Real Madrid after Medhi Benatia challenged Lucas Vázquez in the box. Juventus players swarmed Oliver, with veteran goalkeeper and captain Gianluigi Buffon at the centre of the confrontation, receiving a red card for verbal abuse. Oliver also issued nine yellow cards during the match. Second goalkeeper Wojciech Szczęsny was forced to be substituted in, with the resulting penalty kick converted by Cristiano Ronaldo in the 98th minute, for a final 4–3 aggregate win for Real Madrid to advance to the semi-final. 

Several days later the police investigated threatening text messages sent to Oliver's wife, Lucy, who had her mobile number posted on social media after the game, which led to the abusive texts. They also looked into reports of banging on the front door of their home and shouting abuse through their letterbox. On 11 May, Buffon was charged by UEFA over post-match comments made about Oliver, with the UEFA Control, Ethics and Disciplinary Body giving Buffon a three-match ban for UEFA competition matches "for which he would be otherwise eligible", on 5 June.

On 26 March 2019, Oliver was appointed to referee in the 2019 FIFA U-20 World Cup in Poland, with Simon Bennett and Stuart Burt serving as his assistant referees. Oliver officiated 3 matches at the tournament, including a group A clash between Senegal and Colombia, a round of 16 clash between Uruguay and Ecuador, and a semi-final between Ecuador and South Korea.

Oliver officiated the 2021 FA Cup Final on 15 May 2021, between Chelsea and Leicester City.

In a May 2022 FIFA pronouncement, Oliver was listed as one of six English officials to oversee matches at that November and December's World Cup.  The list also included referee Anthony Taylor and four compatriot assistant referees—Simon Bennett, Gary Beswick, Stuart Burt, and Adam Nunn.

On 10 August 2022, he was the referee for the 2022 UEFA Super Cup between Eintracht Frankfurt and Real Madrid.

List of refereed domestic finals

 Michael Oliver

See also
List of football referees

References

External links
Refworld.com
Michael Oliver Referee Statistics at soccerbase.com

English football referees
UEFA Champions League referees
UEFA Europa League referees
1985 births
Living people
Sportspeople from Ashington
Premier League referees
FA Cup Final referees
UEFA Euro 2020 referees
2022 FIFA World Cup referees
FIFA World Cup referees